Wang Yafan and Zhang Kailin were the defending champions, but Wang chose not to participate. Zhang partnered Yang Zhaoxuan, but lost to Han Xinyun and Ye Qiuyu in the quarterfinals.

Han and Ye won the title, defeating Prarthana Thombare and Xun Fangying in the final, 6–2, 7–5.

Seeds

Draw

References
Main Draw

Kunming Open - Doubles